Bay Metropolitan Transportation Authority (Bay Metro) is the primary bus agency providing intra- and inter-city routes for the Bay City Metropolitan Statistical Area centered on Bay City, Michigan since 1974.

History 
Public transportation in Bay City began with the Bay City Street Railway Company, which operated horsecars starting in 1865. Electric streetcars began replacing the horsecars in 1889; by 1893 electric lines ran down Washington, Center, and Third Streets, meeting at Center and Washington; an interurban electric line connected Bay City to Saginaw, Flint, Detroit, and Cincinnati by 1895. The West Bay City Street Railway Co. (1889) and Union Street Railway Co. (1892) eventually merged as the Bay Cities Consolidated Railway Co. (1893), which underwent several name changes until the streetcars were replaced by buses in 1921. From 1921 to 1974, public transportation was provided by private operators (Balcer Bros. and Hibblers Bay City Community Service) with one interruption between 1958 and 1959.

Bay Metropolitan Transportation Authority began operations in 1974; its headquarters were built in 1981 in Bay City, Michigan, and most fixed routes operate out of the Central Bus Station in downtown Bay City at 1124 Washington Avenue.

Bay Metro temporarily suspended service during the COVID-19 pandemic in Michigan; fixed-route service resumed on July 6, 2021, with Routes 1 and 4 following in late August.

Governance 
Bay Metro is governed by a board of directors selected by the chair of the Bay County Board of Commissioners. The term of each Bay Metro board member is three years; the total membership has varied between nine and eleven.

Services 
Bay Metro operates nine fixed routes and a dial-a-ride point-to-point service branded DART.

Fares 
Fixed route fares are US$1, with discounts for students with a valid identification card ($0.75) and qualified individuals (seniors and disabled, $0.50). Single-ride DART fares are US$1.50.

Transfers 
Riders on Route 4 may transfer to Saginaw Transit Authority Regional Services at the Saginaw Valley State University stop or to Midland County Connection at the Midland DHHS stop. No fare discounts are offered.

Fleet 
The fixed-route transit fleet primarily uses Gillig Advantage buses in 29' and 40' nominal lengths.

References

External links 

Public transportation in Michigan
Bay City, Michigan